Dumitru D. Roṣca (January 29, 1895 – August 25, 1980) was a Romanian philosopher, professor and member of the Romanian Academy.

Biography
Dumitru Roşca attended philosophy classes in Paris at Sorbonne. He is best known for his doctoral thesis defended at Sorbonne in 1928: "The Influence of Taine on Hegel". The book was dedicated to Emile Bréhier.

Dumitru Roşca translated Georg Wilhelm Friedrich Hegel's works into Romanian. He also translated  Hegel's "Life of Jesus" into French.

He published in French "Existénce tragique: An Attempt of Philosophical Synthesis". He contributed through his writings to the theory of existentialism.

His works were influenced by Hegel and Søren Kierkegaard.

Works
Istoria filosofiei (1964)
Prelegeri de estetică (1966)
Ştiinţa logicii (1966)
Studii filosofice (1967)
Însemnări despre Hegel (1967)
Influenţa lui Hegel asupra lui Taine (1968)
Existenţa tragică (1968)
Prelegeri de filosofie a istoriei (1969)
Studii şi eseuri filosofice (1970)
Oameni şi climate (1971)

External links

1895 births
1980 deaths
People from Săliște
Romanian Austro-Hungarians
20th-century Romanian philosophers
Academic staff of Babeș-Bolyai University
Historians of philosophy
Philosophers of art
Romanian philosophers
University of Paris alumni
Titular members of the Romanian Academy
Romanian writers in French
20th-century Romanian writers